Bybit is a cryptocurrency exchange founded in 2018. Bybit is headquartered in Dubai, United Arab Emirates.

History 
In March 2018, Ben Zhou founded Bybit. , the Bybit exchange was blocked from operating in the United States, and in 2021 Bybit received warnings from the regulators in Japan and Canada.

In November 2019, the company organized a Bitcoin trading competition called "BTC Brawl". In 2020 and 2021, Bybit ran a trading competition called "World Series of Trading". In February 2021, the company sponsored Red Bull Racing.

Bybit started spot trading on July 15, 2021. In August 2021, Bybit announced sponsorship deals with esports organisations NAVI, Virtus.pro, Astralis and Alliance.

References 

Digital currency exchanges